Fábio Miguel Silva Duarte (born 11 May 1998) is a Portuguese professional footballer who plays as a goalkeeper for Vilafranquense.

Club career
Born in Amadora, Duarte started his football career at S.L. Benfica's youth system in 2007. Following his progress through their youth ranks, he made his professional debut with the club's reserve team in a 5–1 LigaPro loss to Real on 18 February 2018.

Honours
Benfica
 UEFA Youth League runner-up: 2016–17

References

External links

1998 births
People from Amadora
Sportspeople from Lisbon District
Living people
Portuguese footballers
Portugal youth international footballers
Association football goalkeepers
C.F. Os Belenenses players
S.L. Benfica B players
U.D. Vilafranquense players
Liga Portugal 2 players